The Jehiel Cochran House (also known locally as Brickhaven) is a historic house at 65 Burnham Road in Andover, Massachusetts. It is listed on the National Register of Historic Places and Massachusetts cultural inventory records at 63 Burnham Road, but by the Andover Historical Society at 65 Burnham Road. The house, built in the 1830s, is locally distinctive for its use of brick, and for its association with the Jehiel Cochran, the brickyard owner who built it.  It was listed on the National Register in 1982.

Description and history
The Cochran House is set back from the north side of Burnham Road, just east of its crossing of some railroad tracks. It is a rectangular brick structure,  stories high, with a side gable roof and twin interior chimneys. A large modern addition has been built to the right of the original structure that rivals it in size. The windows are six-over-six sash, with granite lintels, and the center entry is flanked by sidelight windows. The property also includes a small vintage barn.

The house, built in the 1830s, is uncommon because most houses in the area of that period were built of wood. Jehiel Cochran, the builder and owner, was an Andover native who owned a brickyard nearby. Cochran was apparently associated with the brickyard for some time, but was listed as a farmer when he died in 1860. The house he built is a well-executed conservative vernacular rendition of a transitional Federal-Greek Revival style.

See also
National Register of Historic Places listings in Andover, Massachusetts
National Register of Historic Places listings in Essex County, Massachusetts

References

Houses in Andover, Massachusetts
National Register of Historic Places in Andover, Massachusetts
Houses on the National Register of Historic Places in Essex County, Massachusetts
Greek Revival houses in Massachusetts
Federal architecture in Massachusetts